Rego is an unincorporated community in Southeast Township, Orange County, in the U.S. state of Indiana.

History
A post office was established at Rego in 1867, and remained in operation until it was discontinued 1932.

Geography

References

Unincorporated communities in Orange County, Indiana
Unincorporated communities in Indiana